Non insulin dependent diabetes mellitus 1 is a protein that in humans is encoded by the NIDDM1 gene.

References